The 2016 Claro Open Barranquilla was a professional tennis tournament played on clay courts. It was the fifth edition of the tournament which was part of the 2016 ATP Challenger Tour. It took place in Barranquilla, Colombia between 6 and 11 September 2016.

Singles main-draw entrants

Seeds

Other entrants
The following players received wildcards into the singles main draw:
  Santiago Giraldo
  Gregorio Cordonnier
  José Daniel Bendeck
  Víctor Estrella Burgos

The following player received entry into the singles main draw as an alternate:
  João Pedro Sorgi

The following players received entry from the qualifying draw:
  Gianni Mina
  Fernando Romboli
  Juan Sebastián Gómez
  Bruno Sant'Anna

Champions

Singles
* Diego Schwartzman def.  Rogério Dutra Silva 6–4, 6–1.

Doubles

 Alejandro Falla /  Eduardo Struvay def.  Gonzalo Escobar /  Roberto Quiroz 6–4,7–5.

References

Claro Open Barranquilla
Seguros Bolívar Open Barranquilla
2016 in Colombian tennis